Coeliccia is a genus of damselflies in the family Platycnemididae. They are distributed in Asia from India to Japan to Indonesia. It is the largest genus in the family, with around 80 species.

Species
These are the species currently described in Coeliccia:

References

External links
Dow, R. A. (2010). Revision of the genus Coeliccia (Zygoptera: Platycnemididae) in Borneo. Part I: The borneensis–group of species. Zoologische Mededelingen, 84(7), 117-157.

Platycnemididae
Zygoptera genera
Taxa named by William Forsell Kirby